Catherine Telegdi (Hungarian: Katalin Telegdi) (1492–1547) was a Hungarian noble lady, the daughter of royal treasurer Stephen Telegdi and his wife Margit Bebek de Pelsőcz.

Family
Telegdi married the deputy voivode of Transylvania Stephen VIII Báthory. They had eight children from this marriage:
Nicholas, mentioned in 1516,
Catharine, mentioned in 1516,
Andrew (d. 1563),
Sophia, wife of Demeter Csáky de Kőrösszegh,
Anna, the mother of the "Blood Countess" Elizabeth Báthory,
Elizabeth, wife of Lajos Pekry de Petrovina and László Kerecsélyi de Kányaföld,
Christopher (1530–1581), who governed Transylvania in the absence of his younger brother Stefan,
Stephen (1533–1586), who became  Voivode (and later Prince) of Transylvania and King of Poland.

References

Sources
 Derwich M. (red.), Polska. Dzieje cywilizacji i narodu. Monarchia Jagiellonów 1399-1586, Wydawnictwo Dolnośląskie, Warszawa – Wrocław 2003, s. 227.

Hungarian nobility
1492 births
1547 deaths
Catherine